Hlavnice is a municipality and village in Opava District in the Moravian-Silesian Region of the Czech Republic. It has about 700 inhabitants.

History
The first written mention of Hlavnice is from 1250.

References

External links

Villages in Opava District